Dioști is a commune in Dolj County, Oltenia, Romania with a population of 3,338 people. It is composed of three villages: Ciocănești, Dioști and Radomir.

References

Communes in Dolj County
Localities in Oltenia